Eventuality: The Charlie Kohlhase Quintet Plays the Music of Roswell Rudd is an album by saxophonist Charlie Kohlhase on which he and his quintet perform music composed by trombonist Roswell Rudd, with whom Kohlhase studied. It was recorded at PBS Studios in Westwood, Massachusetts in January 2000, and was released later that year by Nada Music. On the album, Kohlhase is joined by Rudd on trombone and mellophone, Matt Langley on saxophone, John Carlson on trumpet and flugelhorn, John Turner on bass, and Johnny McLellan on drums.

Regarding the fact that the album has had little distribution, Kohlhase commented: "No one can find it anywhere in the world. It's a great album but it's a top secret album."

Reception

In a review for AllMusic, David Dupont wrote: "As with all Rudd work, this music is autobiographical in nature, tied to specific situations or portraits of relationships. And as with all his work, it is intensely lyrical... While the trombonist is the most compelling solo voice on the session, everyone else speaks with a distinctive sound, doing justice to the material. The group also is equal to the task of executing the often-tricky ensemble parts."

Writing for All About Jazz, Raul d'Gama Rose called the album an "all but ignored masterpiece," and commented: "This album featured some of Rudd's compositions that have not often made it to album, but are wonderful studies in the career of the trombonist and composer."

One Final Note's David Dupont noted that the album "provides a well-rounded portrait" of Rudd, and praised "Siva & Sakti," stating that it "draws a lyrical line from the classic ballad writers of Broadway through Monk and [Herbie] Nichols to his own distinctive expression."

Eventuality was awarded "Best Jazz Album" at the 2002 Boston Music Awards.

Track listing
All compositions by Roswell Rudd.

 "Hermes Trizz" – 1:02
 "Something of Yours" – 6:49
 "Joel" – 12:03
 "Tout de Moi" – 5:08
 "Emanation" – 4:28
 "Eventuality" – 8:03
 "Tetraktys" – 3:08
 "Sive & Sakti" – 6:29
 "Prelude to a Lease" – 6:31
 "Palmer House Rocking" – 13:19
 "Breaker" – 3:23

Personnel 
 Roswell Rudd – trombone, mellophone, vocals
 Charlie Kohlhase – tenor saxophone, alto saxophone, baritone saxophone, vocals
 Matt Langley – tenor saxophone, soprano saxophone, vocals
 John Carlson – trumpet, flugelhorn, vocals
 John Turner – bass
 Johnny McLellan – drums
 Jill Hunter – percussion, vocals (track 5)
 Joe Washek – percussion, vocals (track 5)

References

2000 albums
Roswell Rudd albums